Shirayuki may refer to:

 Shirayuki (train), a train service in Japan
 "Shirayuki" (song), a 2013 song by Myname
 Berry Shirayuki, character in Tokyo Mew Mew
 Japanese destroyer Shirayuki